The following is a list of all team-to-team transactions that have occurred in the National Basketball Association during the 2006–07 NBA season.  It lists what team each player has been traded to, signed by, or claimed by, and for which players or draft picks, if applicable.

Retirement

Trades

Free Agency

Draft
The 2006 NBA draft was held on June 28, 2006, at the Theatre in New York City.

Round 1

Round 2

Signed Undrafted Players

Released

Waived

References

Transactions
NBA transactions